Stauprimide is a semi-synthetic analog of the staurosporine family of indolocarbazoles. Stauprimide was first published in 1994 as part of an extensive structure-activity investigation to improve the selective inhibition of protein kinase C as a potential antitumor agent. More recently, stauprimide has been shown to increase the efficiency of the directed differentiation of mouse and human embryonic stem cells in synergy with defined extracellular signaling cues. Stauprimide interacts with NME2 (PUF) transcription factor to down-regulate c-Myc expression, leading to differentiation of stem cells.

See also 
 Staurosporine
 Rebeccamycin
 K252a
 Midostaurin

References 

Indolocarbazoles
Protein kinase inhibitors